The 1958 All-Ireland Senior Camogie Championship was the high point of the 1958 season in Camogie. The championship was won by Dublin who defeated Tipperary by a 15-point margin in the final.

Championship
Tipeprary were trained by 1930s hurler Bernard Sands. Mary England Kathleen Downes, Kathleen Griffin (two each), Edie Merrigan and Breda Scully scored in Tipperary's dramatic eight goals to 5-1 emi-final victory over Antrim at Roscrea. The match produced such a high standard of hurling that the spectators were applauding for most of the game, The Nenagh Guardian reported. Galway described the semi-final encounter as its biggest ever camogie fixture.

Final
The final was played after the Tipperary v Kilkenny hurling semi-final with some 6-7,000 of the 53,357 attendance staying on to view the camogie match. Financial restraints prevented Tipperary from booking into a hotel and so players had made their own way to Dublin and some had stayed overnight with relatives. They took the lead with a goal from Kathleen Downes in the first minute of the game. from the tenth minute Dublin asserted their dominance. Mitchel Cogley wrote in the Irish Independent: Tipperary flattered only to deceive for the opening ten minutes and even allowing for a couple of fine efforts later on, they were defending for most of the game. For once Kathleen Mills did not display her general all-round ability, but as a contribution to winning her 13th All-Ireland medal she scored a wonder goal which must rank as the greatest ever seen. From fully 45 yards out on the sideline, the CIE club girl with deadly accuracy gave Cathleen Carroll no chance. Dublin's strength lay in the ability of Kathleen Ryder and Una O'Connor to make the most of their chances against a Tipperary defence that put in extremely hard work for a major portion of the second half. Cathleen Carroll, the Roscrea girl who kept goal for Tipperary played well and added to the numerous goalmouth thrills by bringing off a couple of freakish saves.

Final stages

 
MATCH RULES
50 minutes
Replay if scores level
Maximum of 3 substitutions

See also
 All-Ireland Senior Hurling Championship
 Wikipedia List of Camogie players
 National Camogie League
 Camogie All Stars Awards
 Ashbourne Cup

References

External links
 Camogie Association
 Historical reports of All Ireland finals
 All-Ireland Senior Camogie Championship: Roll of Honour
 Camogie on facebook
 Camogie on GAA Oral History Project

All-Ireland Senior Camogie Championship
1958
All-Ireland Senior Camogie Championship
All-Ireland Senior Camogie Championship